The canton of Port-sur-Saône is an administrative division of the Haute-Saône department, northeastern France. Its borders were modified at the French canton reorganisation which came into effect in March 2015. Its seat is in Port-sur-Saône.

It consists of the following communes:
 
Amance
Amoncourt
Anchenoncourt-et-Chazel
Anjeux
Auxon
Bassigney
Baulay
Betoncourt-Saint-Pancras
Bougnon
Bouligney
Bourguignon-lès-Conflans
Breurey-lès-Faverney
Buffignécourt
Chaux-lès-Port
Conflandey
Contréglise
Cubry-lès-Faverney
Cuve
Dampierre-lès-Conflans
Dampvalley-Saint-Pancras
Équevilley
Faverney
Flagy
Fleurey-lès-Faverney
Fontenois-la-Ville
Girefontaine
Grattery
Jasney
Mailleroncourt-Saint-Pancras
Melincourt
Menoux
Mersuay
Montureux-lès-Baulay
La Pisseure
Plainemont
Polaincourt-et-Clairefontaine
Port-sur-Saône
Provenchère
Saint-Rémy-en-Comté
Saponcourt
Scye
Senoncourt
Le Val-Saint-Éloi
Vauchoux
Venisey
Villers-sur-Port

References

Cantons of Haute-Saône